David Jack Levene (25 February 1908 – 1970) was an English footballer who played for Hugonians, Northfleet United, Tottenham Hotspur, Crystal Palace and Clapton Orient.

Football career 
Levene began his career at non-league team Hugonians before joining the Tottenham Hotspur "nursery" club Northfleet United. In 1932 the defender signed for Tottenham. Levene went on to feature in 12 matches in all competitions for the "Lilywhites". He later played for Crystal Palace where he appeared on 23 occasions in all competitions  After playing professional football in France, Levene ended his playing career at Clapton Orient.

References 

1908 births
1970 deaths
English footballers
Footballers from Bethnal Green
Northfleet United F.C. players
Tottenham Hotspur F.C. players
Crystal Palace F.C. players
Leyton Orient F.C. players
English Football League players
Association football defenders